The Pence Automobile Company Warehouse, also known as Richtman's Printing, is a historic commercial building located on Northern Pacific Avenue in Fargo, North Dakota.  It was designed in 1918 by Minneapolis architects Long, Lamoreaux & Long in Classical Revival architecture.  The building was completed in 1920 at a cost of more than $175,000.  It was listed on the National Register of Historic Places in 1994.

It is a three-story building that was originally designed to be the premier auto sales and service building in the area. It was designed with a car and truck showroom on the ground floor and service and storage above. 

Harry E. Pence (1868–1933) of Minneapolis was  president and general manager of the Pence Automobile, the major regional distributor of Buick automobiles.

See also
Pence Automobile Company Building

References

Commercial buildings on the National Register of Historic Places in North Dakota
Neoclassical architecture in North Dakota
Commercial buildings completed in 1920
Warehouses on the National Register of Historic Places
Buildings and structures in Fargo, North Dakota
National Register of Historic Places in Cass County, North Dakota
Buick
Auto dealerships on the National Register of Historic Places
1920 establishments in North Dakota